Longtian is a town in Ningxiang City, Hunan Province, China. It is surrounded by Gaoming Township on the west, Xiangzikou Town on the north, Qingshanqiao Town and Shatian Township on the east, and Qixingjie Town on the south.

Administrative division
The town is divided into five villages and one community, the following areas: 
 Longtian Community
 Yuetang
 Baihua
 Qilishan
 Hengling 
 Shiwu

Geography
There are cherry blossoms in its mountains.

Economy
The region abounds with manganese.

Culture
Huaguxi is the most influence local theater.

Transportation
The Provincial Highway S311 runs southeast to northwest through Qingshanqiao Town and Gaoming Township.

The County Road X104 runs northeast to southwest through the towns of Xiangzikou, Qixingjie and Shatian Township.

References

External links
 

Divisions of Ningxiang
Ningxiang